Cassie Davidson (born 6 October 1996) is an Australian rules footballer playing for West Coast in the AFL Women's competition. Davidson was drafted by Fremantle with their eleventh selection and eighty-fourth overall in the 2016 AFL Women's draft. She made her debut in the thirty-two point loss to the Western Bulldogs at VU Whitten Oval in the opening round of the 2017 season. She played every match in her debut season to finish with seven matches.

In April 2019, Davidson was traded to expansion club West Coast. In August 2020, Davidson was delisted by West Coast.

References

External links 

1996 births
Living people
Fremantle Football Club (AFLW) players
Australian rules footballers from Western Australia
Indigenous Australian players of Australian rules football
West Coast Eagles (AFLW) players